Parliamentary elections were held in Portugal on 21 August 1881. The result was a landslide victory for the Regeneration Party, which won 122  seats.

Results

The results exclude seats from overseas territories.

References

Legislative elections in Portugal
Portugal
1881 in Portugal
August 1881 events